Roland Baracskai (born 11 April 1992 in Budapest) is a Hungarian professional footballer who plays for Csákvár.

Club statistics

Updated to games played as of 9 December 2017.

References

MLSZ 
HLSZ 

1992 births
Living people
Footballers from Budapest
Hungarian footballers
Hungary youth international footballers
Association football forwards
FC Felcsút players
Fehérvár FC players
Puskás Akadémia FC players
Soproni VSE players
Mezőkövesdi SE footballers
Győri ETO FC players
Nemzeti Bajnokság I players
Nemzeti Bajnokság II players
21st-century Hungarian people